Nothia is the genus name of:

 Nothia (plant), a fossil vascular plant from the Early Devonian.
 Nothia (foraminifera), a fossil genus of foraminiferans in the class Monothalamea.